RUNAGROUND (born Andrew Kirk, in High Point, NC) is an American electropop, artist, producer, and singer-songwriter.

RUNAGROUND became popular on YouTube in 2012 with his self-produced music video covers of chart topping songs such as "Wake Me Up" – Avicii, "La La La" – Sam Smith / Naughty Boy, and many others, which generated over 40 million views. RUNAGROUND has accumulated a combined subscriber fan base of over 800 thousand dedicated listeners across YouTube and Google Plus alone, which have resulted in more than 100 million combined plays online, and over 100 thousand units sold independently.

The RUNAGROUND stage name and moniker is derived from a story that Andrew's grandfather Frank experienced and retold about his navy ship, the LCI-G-580, running aground off the coast of the Philippines during World War II, just before entering what would later be recognized as the bloodiest battle in Naval history, the "Battle of Leyte Gulf.”

Career
On June 30, 2014, RUNAGROUND released its first original EP Anti-Gravity (titled after and inspired by life events and trials of famed inventor Nikola Tesla) which peaked at #23 on the iTunes songwriter album chart.

In 2015 Andrew collaborated with, produced, and co-wrote, original music & cover videos for YouTube based musicians such as Madilyn Bailey, Alexi Blue, Taryn Southern, and Ebony Day.

On July 5, 2015, RUNAGROUND performed his original song "We Are One" live at the Dalai Lama's Global Compassion Summit, held at Honda Center Arena in Anaheim, CA, alongside the 14th Dalai Lama, Michael Franti, and many other celebrity guests and speakers. RUNAGROUND was commissioned to write and produce an original song to commemorate the Dalai Lama's lifelong quest for peace and compassion throughout the world. RUNAGROUND wrote and produced the song within a week, and was featured in the celebrity music video alongside Randy Jackson, Russel Simmons, Arianna Huffington, Larry King, Common, and others.

In November 2015, RUNAGROUND performed live across Belgium for a radio and TV promotional tour around his 2nd collaboration as a vocalist and top liner for Belgium's number 1 hard dance Dj Mark With A K. The song "See Me Now" reached #19 on iTunes Belgium's pop chart. "Here We Come", a song written and co-produced by RUNAGROUND as the first collaboration with Mark with a K, reached critical acclaim and popularity with over 230,000 plays on YouTube and a live Reverze Festival performance for a sold-out crowd of over 17,000 Belgian fans singing along to the live performance of the song.

On November 17, 2015, RUNAGROUND released "Stars Come Out" ft. The Disco Fries, independently, and saw it reach over 1.5 million streams on Spotify by February, and being included on several of Spotify's curated dance/electronic music playlists.

In January 2016 RUNAGROUND signed a recording deal with NYC based record label Sony/Robbins Entertainment, and is currently working on his first radio single to be launched in March 2016.

On January 31 RUNAGROUND was featured on the AXS TV cable show Breaking Band alongside Grammy Nominated Mentor and Electronic Artist/Music Producer/DJ, Moby. The show culminated in RUNAGROUND & Moby collaborating on a live performance of Moby's popular hit "Southside" originally performed by him and Gwen Stefani.

References

External links
 Official RUNAGROUND website

1987 births
American electronic musicians
American male singer-songwriters
American pop musicians
Singer-songwriters from North Carolina
American dance musicians
Living people
21st-century American singers
21st-century American male singers